Thomasia tremandroides is a species of flowering plant in the family Malvaceae and is endemic to the south-west of Western Australia. It is an erect or low, spreading shrub with many stems, flimsy, papery, egg-shaped leaves and racemes of papery, mauve to pink flowers.

Description
Both surface of the leaves are densely covered with fine, star-shaped hairs. The sepals are papery, mauve to pink, the petals purplish-black and minute. Flowering occurs from August to November.

Taxonomy
Thomasia tremandroides was first formally described in 1974 by Susan Paust in the journal Nuytsia from specimens she collected north of Wubin in 1972. The specific epithet (tremandroides) means resembling some species of "Tremandraceae", (now included in the family Elaeocarpaceae).

Distribution and habitat
This thomasia grows in open situations or as an undershrub between Bencubbin and the Murchison River, but mainly south of Three Springs, in the Avon Wheatbelt, Geraldton Sandplains and  Murchison bioregions in the south-west of Western Australia.

Conservation status
Thomasia microphylla is listed as "not threatened" by the Government of Western Australia Department of Biodiversity, Conservation and Attractions.

References

tremandroides
Rosids of Western Australia
Plants described in 1974